A Late Divorce is a novel written by A. B. Yehoshua, originally published in Hebrew.

Synopsis
Five years after being attacked at knifepoint by his wife, Yehuda Kaminka returns to Israel from the United States in order to divorce her. The novel follows the lives of individuals in the Kaminka family, including Naomi (Yehuda's institutionalized wife), and the couple's adult children (Tsvi, Asa, and Ya'el), among others. Each of the children's lives is fraught with peril: Asa, a university lecturer in Jerusalem, is caught in a sexless marriage with the aspiring writer Dina, Tsvi spends his days in Tel Aviv  lamenting over his relationship with his father and using his middle-aged homosexual lover, and Ya'el, the couple's daughter, is married to a widely-disliked lawyer. The novel, like Yehoshua's debut novel The Lover, is told from a first-person point of view, with each chapter from the view of a different character, and explores themes of unfulfilled romance, Jewish diaspora, social crises, and generational estrangement.

References

External links

1984 novels